Fathallah Oualalou (born 1942 in Rabat) is a Moroccan politician. He was the mayor of Rabat from 2009 to 2015. He was the Minister of Economy and Finance of Morocco between March 1998 and October 2007. He is a member of the Socialist Union of Popular Forces party (USFP).

Oualalou graduated in economics from the Mohammed V University in Rabat, going on to obtain a "Diplôme d'études supérieures" (DES) in economics in Paris in 1966.

References

See also
 Politics of Morocco

Finance ministers of Morocco
Government ministers of Morocco
Members of the House of Representatives (Morocco)
People from Rabat
1942 births
Living people
Socialist Union of Popular Forces politicians
Mohammed V University alumni
Moroccan economists